Boys Will Be Boys! is the debut studio album by South African rock band Rabbitt, released in 1975 on Jo'Burg Records. The album reached gold certification in the country faster than any other previously released album in South Africa at the time. It also earned the group a Sarie Award in the Best Contemporary Pop category. In 1989, Boys Will Be Boys! was reissued in Germany and the United States.

Track listing
"Something's Going Wrong with My Baby" (Trevor Rabin) — 4:45
"Savage" (Rabin) — 4:43
"Lifeline" (Patrick van Blerk, Rabin) — 6:00
"Locomotive Breath" (Ian Anderson) — 3:35
"Hard Ride" (Rabin) — 4:05
"Baby's Leaving" (Rabin) — 2:20
"Eventides" (Rabin) — 2:34
"Looking for the Man" (Van Blerk, Rabin) — 4:00
"Death of Tulio" (Rabin) — 0:22
"Charlie" (Van Blerk, Rabin) — 2:35
"Brand New Love"* (Rabin) — 3:38
"Auld Lang Syne"* (Traditional) — 1:18

Bonus tracks on 2006 CD re-issue (Fresh Music)

Personnel
Rabbitt
Trevor Rabin – lead vocals (except "Hard Ride"), electric and acoustic guitars, keyboards, synthesizers
Duncan Faure – keyboards, synthesizers, lead vocals on "Hard Ride"
Ronnie Robot – bass guitar
Neil Cloud – drums, percussion

Additional personnel
Godfrey Rabin (Trevor's father) – violin solo on "Hard Ride"
Pro Arte – strings arrangement
Bram Verhoef – conductor

Production
Trevor Rabin – arrangement, production
Julian Laxton – production, engineering, mixing
Patrick van Blerk – production

External links
[ "Boys Will Be Boys] found at allmusic Retrieved 10/19/2010

1975 debut albums
Capricorn Records albums
Albums produced by Trevor Rabin